The Malani (Dutch: Marowijnekreek; or Marouini) is a river in the disputed area between French Guiana and Suriname. According to Suriname, it is the border river, however France considers the Litani the border. It has its mouth at the confluence with the Litany at Antecume Pata and continues its journey as the Lawa River.

Name 
The river is known in Suriname and the Netherlands as the Marowijnekreek. It used to called Marouini in France, however the Wayana name of Malani is becoming the accepted version. The names Marouini and Marowijnekreek were also used in the past for the Lawa River.

Course 
The river first heads south and makes a 180 degree turn around Pic Coudreau and continues its journey northwards through the tropical rainforest. The Lawa in turn flows into the Maroni which has its mouth at the Atlantic Ocean.

Former settlements 
In 1791, the Aluku Maroons were chased out of Suriname and moved into French Guiana. The tribe continued their journey to the Malani. They were not completely safe there either, because Boni, the leader of the tribe, was killed on the river on 19 February 1793. The Aluku eventually returned to Gaan Day along the Lawa River, and had abandoned the Malani around 1839.

From the 1880s onwards, the indigenous Wayana moved from the Paru River in Brasil northwards along the Malani and Litani. Several villages were founded which were visited by Henri Coudreau in 1893. With the exception of Saint-Laurent which is located at the mouth, the river is nowadays uninhabited.

See also 
 Borders of Suriname#Eastern border
 List of rivers of French Guiana
 List of rivers of Suriname

References

Rivers of French Guiana
Rivers of Suriname
Sipaliwini District
Maripasoula